is a Japanese  basketball player who plays for Aisin AW Wings of the Women's Japan Basketball League .  She also plays for Japan women's national 3x3 team.

References

1998 births
Living people
Basketball players at the 2018 Asian Games
Sportspeople from Ishikawa Prefecture
Asian Games medalists in basketball
Asian Games silver medalists for Japan
Medalists at the 2018 Asian Games